Phlox  is a fictional character, played by John Billingsley, in the television series Star Trek: Enterprise. Set in the 22nd century in the science fiction Star Trek universe, he is the chief medical officer aboard the first Warp 5 starship, Enterprise (NX-01), commanded by Captain Jonathan Archer. Phlox first appears in the premiere episode, "Broken Bow" (2001), marking the franchise's introduction of the Denobulan race.

Overview
Phlox, a Denobulan, was on Earth as part of the Interspecies Medical Exchange when he was called to serve aboard the Enterprise. As part of the Exchange, he regularly corresponds with Dr. Lucas, his human counterpart on his home planet of Denobula Triaxa.

In accordance with Denobulan custom, Phlox has three wives, each of whom has two other husbands. Only one of his wives, Feezal, was seen on the show. Phlox has five children by his wives: two daughters, both of whom also work in the medical field; and three sons, one of whom is an artist, while the youngest, Metus, is estranged from him (Phlox attempts to reconcile with him at the end of episode 21, season 2).

Phlox is portrayed as having an open mind to other species and cultures—even the Antarans, a race that once warred with the Denobulans. He is extremely frank about romantic and sexual matters, often to other crew members' embarrassment, and sometimes plays the role of matchmaker. He has an interest in natural remedies, and his sickbay contains an interplanetary menagerie, some of which are food for other animals that are sources for medical drugs.

Phlox is curious with a wry sense of humor. He has an affinity for Earth cuisine, particularly Chinese food (especially egg drop soup). He is also interested in religion: He once prayed with a group of monks who visited Enterprise, spent a week with monks at a Tibetan monastery, attended Mass at St. Peter's Basilica in Rome, and observed the Tal-Shanar ritual at the Vulcan compound in Sausalito.

Phlox's physical abilities were revealed gradually during the franchise. He appears to need little sleep, instead embarking on an annual "hibernation" that lasts for six days. He also has great control over his facial muscles, being able to open his mouth wider than humans, as demonstrated by the impossibly large grin he occasionally sports ("Broken Bow", "A Night in Sickbay", "These Are the Voyages..."). When threatened, he has the ability to inflate his head like a blowfish to scare off attackers ("Home").

Reception 
Media website The Digital Fix said that Billingsley delivered a  "consistently charming performance", and that he convincingly portrayed Phlox as a doctor, including his ability to transition "from a reassuring bedside manner to one of sombre gravitas".

In 2015, Den of Geek, in a review of important show characters, noted him as "funny, quirky Phlox", and recommended the episodes "Dear Doctor", "Stigma", "The Breach", and  "Doctor’s Orders" as his best appearances.

In 2016, SyFy ranked Phlox #1 of the six main-cast space doctors in the Star Trek franchise, citing his good bedside manner, relaxing demeanor, and success in curing patients, including those partially Borged.

In 2018, The Wrap ranked Phlox 27th out of 39 main-cast Star Trek franchise characters, prior to Star Trek: Discovery.

See also
 List of Star Trek: Enterprise characters

References

External links

Star Trek: Enterprise characters
Star Trek alien characters
Fictional physicians
Fictional psychiatrists
Fictional surgeons
Starfleet medical personnel
Television characters introduced in 2001
Polygamy in fiction
Fictional people from the 22nd-century